Abraham Mora Acevedo (born 12 September 1989, in Asunción) is a Paraguayan judoka. At the 2012 Summer Olympics he competed in the Men's 66 kg, but was defeated in the second round.

References

Paraguayan male judoka
1989 births
Living people
Sportspeople from Asunción
Olympic judoka of Paraguay
Judoka at the 2012 Summer Olympics
21st-century Paraguayan people